Harnish is a surname. Notable people with the surname include:

Chandler Harnish (born 1988), American football quarterback
Reno L. Harnish (born 1949), American diplomat
Rick Harnish, American non-profit executive
Verne Harnish (born 1954), American businessman